Parhat v. Gates, 532 F.3d 834 (D.C. Cir. 2008), was a case involving a petition for review under the Detainee Treatment Act of 2005 filed on behalf of Huzaifa Parhat, and sixteen other Uyghur detainees held in extrajudicial detention in the United States Guantanamo Bay detention camps, in Cuba.

Rasul v. Bush
Initially, the Bush Presidency
asserted that none of the captives apprehended during the "global war on terror" were protected by the Geneva Conventions.  The Bush Presidency asserted that the Guantanamo Bay Naval Base was not United States territory, and that it was not subject to United States law.  Consequently, they challenged that the captives were entitled to submit writs of habeas corpus.

The Supreme Court of the United States ruled, in Rasul v. Bush, that the Guantanamo base was covered by US law.

Appeal under the Detainee Treatment Act

Susan Baker Manning, one of Parhat's attorneys, commented:

On Monday June 23, 2008, a three-judge panel of the U.S. Court of Appeals for the D.C. Circuit announced its decision of three days earlier overturning the determination of Parhat's Combatant Status Review Tribunal.
The court had only published a one paragraph announcement as its full ruling contained classified material, and an unclassified version had not yet been prepared.

On Monday June 30, 2008 the court published a 39-page opinion, written by Circuit Judge Garland.
The ruling was published with a limited number of redactions.

See also
Qassim v. Bush

References

External links
 
 
 

United States habeas corpus case law
United States Court of Appeals for the District of Columbia Circuit cases
2008 in United States case law
Guantanamo captives' habeas corpus petitions